Leurochilus acon, the Smoothlip stargazer, is a species of sand stargazer native to the waters around the Caribbean islands of the Bahamas, the Virgin Islands, Antigua and Cuba where it can be found on bottoms consisting of sand, marl and rock at depths from near the surface to .  It can reach a maximum length of  SL.  This species is currently the only known member of its genus.

References

Dactyloscopidae
Fish of the Caribbean
Fauna of the Bahamas
Fauna of the Greater Antilles
Monotypic fish genera
Fish described in 1968